is a Japanese politician and the 48th - 52nd governor of Hyōgo Prefecture in Japan.
He became the Governor of Hyōgo Profecture in 2001, a position he held for 5 terms over 20 years.
He is a native of Tatsuno, Hyōgo and graduate of the University of Tokyo, he joined the Ministry of Home Affairs in 1968.

2009 election
Gov. Toshizo Ido was re-elected in 2009 to a third term. Ido, backed by the LDP, New Komeito and the Social Democratic Party, appeared to have easily defeated Kotaro Tanaka, 60, endorsed by the Japanese Communist Party. During the campaign, Ido publicized his achievements in promoting reconstruction following the 1995 Great Hanshin earthquake and tackling the swine flu outbreak.

References

External links 
 Official website 

University of Tokyo alumni
Politicians from Hyōgo Prefecture
1945 births
Living people
Governors of Hyōgo Prefecture